Al-Jāmiʿah Al-Islāmiyyah Patiya, better known simply as Patiya Madrasa and formerly known as Al-Madrasah Aḍ-Ḍamīriyyah Qāsim al-ʿUlūm, is a Qawmi Madrasah located in Patiya Upazila of Chittagong District, Bangladesh. It was established in 1938 by Azizul Haq under the direction of Zamiruddin Ahmad. It is also known as an International Islamic University. It has a role in the promotion of Islam in Bangladesh, inclusion of Qawmi Madrasas under one syllabus, providing modern and higher education for scholars.

History
With the patronage of his teacher Zamiruddin Ahmad, Mufti Azizul Haq established a madrasa named Zamiria Qasimul Uloom in 1938. It later came to be known as al-Jamia al-Islamiyyah Patiya and was upgraded into an Islamic university. Azizul Haq spent the rest of his life as the chancellor of this madrasa.

On 27 March 1971, Major-General Ziaur Rahman, the commander of the East Bengal Regiment in Chittagong and later President of Bangladesh, went to the Free Bengal Radio Centre in Kalurghat and proclaimed Bangladeshi independence from Pakistan. This led to violent unrest and the start of the Bangladesh Liberation War. In search of safety, Ziaur Rahman and his associates took their equipment and headed for the Patiya Madrasah where they spent the night in the guesthouse.

Education pattern
The Jāmiʿah has currently these departments of education and classes: Dept. Of Nooranee (kindergarten), Dept. of Nazira and Hifz, and classes from elementary level to the Dawra-e-Hadith (M.A. Class).

 Post-graduate classes
 Short course curricula
 Vocational training and other courses
 Other training and Hifz competition

Al-Jamiah Al-Islamiah is one of the three large madrassahs, along with Darul Uloom Muinul in Hathazari and Jamiatul Uloom Al-Islamia Lalkhan Bazar, that together control over 7000 smaller schools in Bangladesh. The three schools are closely coordinated. This madrasa founded the Anjuman-e-Ittihad al-Madaris (Association of the Unity of Madrasas), an examination board which is adopted by many other madrasas in the south. They publish examinations annually for 6 class groups.

Subordinate madrasas include the Faiziyyah Tajwid al-Quran Madrasa in Hathazari, the Islamic Education Centre and Clinic in Bandarban (est. 1989), the Islamic Missionary Centre and Clinic in Sukhbilas Rangunia, and the Qasimul Uloom Jamil Madrasah in Bogra (est. 1960) which is the largest madrasa in North Bengal.

Departments

Specialised
Dar al-Ifta, the fatwa department which teaches higher-level fiqh
Department of Tafsir, teaching Quranic exegesis
Department of Ulum-e-Hadith
Department of Qiraʼat, teaches Tajweed and the 7 modes of recitation
Department of Bengali literature, teaches Bengali and English literature. Founded in 1965 CE, it is the first Qawmi Madrasah to have such a department.
Department of Arabic literature

Short Course Department
Provides Secondary School Certificate in general Bangladeshi education syllabus.

Publications
The monthly Al-Tawheed magazine has been published in Bengali by this Jamiah regularly for 43 years, and there is also the Al-Aziz Bengali magazine. The Arabic magazines published by the Jamiah is Balagh as-Sharq (every three months) and Ad-Dairah.

Notable alumni
A F M Khalid Hossain
Mizanur Rahman Sayed
Abdul Malek Halim
Obaidullah Hamzah, current chancellor and former student
Abu Taher Misbah

See also
List of Deobandi universities
List of Qawmi Madrasas in Bangladesh

References

External links

 Darul Ulooms, Jamiyas and Qaumi Madrasahs Worldwide

Qawmi madrasas of Bangladesh
Deobandi Islamic universities and colleges
Islamic universities and colleges in Bangladesh
1938 establishments in India
Schools in Chittagong District